The CNR Bonnet Carré Spillway-Baton Rouge Bridge is a 1.3 mile (2,092 m or 6,864 ft) bridge that carries a Canadian National Railway rail line over the Bonnet Carré Spillway in St. Charles Parish. Its length once had it included on the list for longest bridges in the world.

The bridge is owned and maintained by the Canadian National Railway corporation and is used by Canadian National Railway freight trains.

See also
List of bridges in the United States

References

External links 
Canadian National Railway website

Railroad bridges in Louisiana
Canadian National Railway bridges in the United States
Buildings and structures in St. Charles Parish, Louisiana
Transportation in St. Charles Parish, Louisiana
Bridges completed in 1936
1936 establishments in Louisiana